The year 2015 was the seventh year in the history of BRACE, a mixed martial arts promotion based in Australia. In 2015 Brace held 6 events.

Events list

Brace 37 

Brace 37 was an event held on November 21, 2015, at AIS Arena in Canberra, Australia.

Results

Brace 36

Brace 36 was an event held on November 19, 2015, at Big Top Luna Park in Sydney, Australia.

Results

Brace 34

Brace 34 was an event held on May 23, 2015, at AIS Arena
in Canberra, Australia.

Results

Brace 33

Brace 33 was an event held on April 18,, 2015, at Panters
in Newcastle, Australia.

Results

Brace 32

Brace 32 was an event held on March 20, 2015, at Big Top Luna Park, in Sydney , Australia.

Results

References 

2015 in mixed martial arts
2015 in Australian sport
BRACE (mixed martial arts) events